Chita Oblast was a federal subject of Russia until February 29, 2008.  On March 1, 2008, it was merged with Agin-Buryat Autonomous Okrug to form Zabaykalsky Krai.

Urban-type settlements under the federal government management:
Gorny (Горный)
Cities and towns under the oblast's jurisdiction:
Chita (Чита) (administrative center)
city administrative districts:
Chernovsky (Черновский)
Ingodinsky (Ингодинский)
Tsentralny (Центральный)
Zheleznodorozhny (Железнодорожный)
Baley (Балей)
Borzya (Борзя)
Krasnokamensk (Краснокаменск)
Petrovsk-Zabaykalsky (Петровск-Забайкальский)
Districts:
Akshinsky (Акшинский)
with 12 rural settlements under the district's jurisdiction.
Alexandrovo-Zavodsky (Александрово-Заводский)
with 19 rural settlements under the district's jurisdiction.
Baleysky (Балейский)
with 9 rural settlements under the district's jurisdiction.
Borzinsky (Борзинский)
Urban-type settlements under the district's jurisdiction:
Sherlovaya Gora (Шерловая Гора)
with 15 selsovets under the district's jurisdiction.
Chernyshevsky (Чернышевский)
Urban-type settlements under the district's jurisdiction:
Aksyonovo-Zilovskoye (Аксёново-Зиловское)
Bukachacha (Букачача)
Chernyshevsk (Чернышевск)
Zhireken (Жирекен)
with 14 rural okrugs under the district's jurisdiction.
Chitinsky (Читинский)
Urban-type settlements under the district's jurisdiction:
Atamanovka (Атамановка)
Novokruchininsky (Новокручининский)
Yablonovo (Яблоново)
with 20 rural okrugs under the district's jurisdiction.
Gazimuro-Zavodsky (Газимуро-Заводский)
with 9 selsovets under the district's jurisdiction.
Kalarsky (Каларский)
Urban-type settlements under the district's jurisdiction:
Novaya Chara (Новая Чара)
with 5 selsovets under the district's jurisdiction.
Kalgansky (Калганский)
Urban-type settlements under the district's jurisdiction:
Kadaya (Кадая)
with 10 selsovets under the district's jurisdiction.
Karymsky (Карымский)
Urban-type settlements under the district's jurisdiction:
Darasun (Дарасун)
Karymskoye (Карымское)
Kurort Darasun resort settlement (Курорт Дарасун)
with 10 selsovets under the district's jurisdiction.
Khiloksky (Хилокский)
Towns under the district's jurisdiction:
Khilok (Хилок)
Urban-type settlements under the district's jurisdiction:
Mogzon (Могзон)
with 10 rural okrugs under the district's jurisdiction.
Krasnochikoysky (Красночикойский)
with 15 selsovets under the district's jurisdiction.
Krasnokamensky (Краснокаменский)
with 9 rural administrations under the district's jurisdiction.
Kyrinsky (Кыринский)
with 14 selsovets under the district's jurisdiction.
Mogochinsky (Могочинский)
Towns under the district's jurisdiction:
Mogocha (Могоча)
Urban-type settlements under the district's jurisdiction:
Amazar (Амазар)
Davenda (Давенда)
Itaka (Итака)
Klyuchevsky (Ключевский)
Ksenyevka (Ксеньевка)
with 2 selsovets under the district's jurisdiction.
Nerchinsko-Zavodsky (Нерчинско-Заводский)
with 15 rural administrations under the district's jurisdiction.
Nerchinsky (Нерчинский)
Towns under the district's jurisdiction:
Nerchinsk (Нерчинск)
Urban-type settlements under the district's jurisdiction:
Priiskovy (Приисковый)
with 13 selsovets under the district's jurisdiction.
Olovyanninsky (Оловяннинский)
Urban-type settlements under the district's jurisdiction:
Kalanguy (Калангуй)
Olovyannaya (Оловянная)
Yasnogorsk (Ясногорск)
Zolotorechensk (Золотореченск)
with 16 selsovets under the district's jurisdiction.
Ononsky (Ононский)
with 11 rural administrations under the district's jurisdiction.
Petrovsk-Zabaykalsky (Петровск-Забайкальский)
Urban-type settlements under the district's jurisdiction:
Balyaga (Баляга)
Novopavlovka (Новопавловка)
Tarbagatay (Тарбагатай)
with 10 selsovets under the district's jurisdiction.
Priargunsky (Приаргунский)
Urban-type settlements under the district's jurisdiction:
Klichka (Кличка)
Priargunsk (Приаргунск)
with 11 rural administrations under the district's jurisdiction.
Shelopuginsky (Шелопугинский)
with 8 rural okrugs under the district's jurisdiction.
Shilkinsky (Шилкинский)
Towns under the district's jurisdiction:
Shilka (Шилка)
Urban-type settlements under the district's jurisdiction:
Arbagar (Арбагар)
Kholbon (Холбон)
Pervomaysky (Первомайский)
with 11 rural okrugs under the district's jurisdiction.
Sretensky (Сретенский)
Towns under the district's jurisdiction:
Sretensk (Сретенск)
Urban-type settlements under the district's jurisdiction:
Kokuy (Кокуй)
Ust-Karsk (Усть-Карск)
with 11 selsovets under the district's jurisdiction.
Tungiro-Olyokminsky (Тунгиро-Олёкминский)
with 4 selsovets under the district's jurisdiction.
Tungokochensky (Тунгокоченский)
Urban-type settlements under the district's jurisdiction:
Vershino-Darasunsky (Вершино-Дарасунский)
with 9 selsovets under the district's jurisdiction.
Ulyotovsky (Улётовский)
Urban-type settlements under the district's jurisdiction:
Drovyanaya (Дровяная)
with 9 rural administrations under the district's jurisdiction.
Zabaykalsky (Забайкальский)
Urban-type settlements under the district's jurisdiction:
Zabaykalsk (Забайкальск)
with 7 rural municipal entities under the district's jurisdiction.

References

See also
Administrative divisions of Agin-Buryat Autonomous Okrug
Administrative divisions of Zabaykalsky Krai

Zabaykalsky Krai
Chita